Romolo Marcellini (6 October 1910 – 3 June 1999) was an Italian film director and screenwriter. He directed 22 films between 1937 and 1969.

Selected filmography
 Stadium (1934)
 Sentinels of Bronze (1937)
 Special Correspondents (1943)
 A Tale of Five Cities (1951)
 Rommel's Treasure (1955)
 Engaged to Death (1957)
 The Grand Olympics (1961)

References

External links

1910 births
1999 deaths
Italian film directors
20th-century Italian screenwriters
Italian male screenwriters
20th-century Italian male writers